General elections were held in Brazil on 1 March 1930. In the presidential elections the result was a victory for Júlio Prestes of the Republican Party of São Paulo, who received 57.7% of the vote.

Results

Aftermath
Prestes never took office as he was overthrown by the Brazilian Revolution on 24 October. The revolution was led by Vargas, an opponent of the oligarchic rule shared between the states of São Paulo and Minas Gerais (known as the café com leite system). Vargas became President of Brazil, ruling until 1945.

References

General elections in Brazil
Brazil
1930 in Brazil
Annulled elections
March 1930 events
Election and referendum articles with incomplete results

Elections of the First Brazilian Republic